Richard Masters (also Master, Mastre or Maistres) was a leading 16th-century English physician and personal doctor of Queen Elizabeth.

Early life
Masters was the son of Robert Masters of Streetend in Willesborough, Kent. He became a fellow at All Souls' College in Oxford, eventually graduating with a B.A. in 1533 and an M.A. in 1537.

He was a personal acquaintance of Rudolph Walther and in 1539 accepted a benefice from the Church of England, however, he forfeited it believing he was not a good clergyman.

Medical career
Masters enrolled at the University of Oxford to study medicine, and by 1545 was an admitted M.B. and granted a licence to practise medicine. In 1553 he became a fellow at the College of Physicians and served as a censor between 1556 and 1558 and in 1560. In 1561 he served as President of the college, and as consiliarius in 1564 and 1583.

Queen Elizabeth
In 1559, Masters was granted a patent of £100 annually to serve as the personal physician to Queen Elizabeth. Queen Elizabeth gave Masters a silver cup with the falcon badge of her mother Anne Boleyn.

Prebendary of York
In 1562, Masters was made Prebendary of York, and in 1565 issued a royal patent for his family and heirs from the Queen receiving the Cirencester Abbey.

Marriage and family
Masters married Elizabeth, daughter of John Fulnetby, Esq. and had seven sons, including:
George, M.P. for Cirencester in 1586, 1588
Thomas, Archdeacon of Salop
Robert Master, Chancellor of Rochester and Lichfield; M.P. for Cricklade in 1601
Henry, Principal of Alban Hall

Masters died in 1588.

References

16th-century English medical doctors
1588 deaths
Fellows of All Souls College, Oxford
Year of birth unknown